Porto Cesareo is a town and comune in the Italian province of Lecce in the Apulia region of south-east Italy.

The area around the sea of Porto Cesareo is a beautiful example of "Maquis Shrubland". Beyond the importance of nature, the sea of Porto Cesareo is of fundamental traction for tourism thanks to the presence of a sandy bottom that remains low for tens of meters and more transparent waters recalling Caribbean atmospheres, as well as due to the large and very long beaches.

The coast is characterized by numerous capes, islets and reefs, among which is of particular importance the large island, also known as the Isola dei Conigli ("Rabbits island"), Isola della Malva, Isola della Testa and Lo Scoglio.

The great natural and economic consequence of Porto Cesareo wealth is still represented by the totality of its sea, so valuable that its protection is a National Marine Park was established.
In 1971, professor P. Parenzan (from the Museum of Marine Biology) found Iris revoluta (a rare species of Iris) on the islet of Mojuso near Porto Cesareo in the gulf of Taranto, Southern Italy.

References

Cities and towns in Apulia
Localities of Salento